The third and final season of the American television series Hannibal premiered on June 4, 2015. The season is produced by Dino de Laurentiis Company, Living Dead Guy Productions, AXN Original Productions, and Gaumont International Television, with Sidonie Dumas, Christophe Riandee, Katie O'Connell, Elisa Todd Ellis, David Slade, Steve Lightfoot, Martha De Laurentiis, and Bryan Fuller serving as executive producers. Fuller serves as the series developer and showrunner, co-writing all 13 episodes of the season. 

The season was ordered in May 2014. The season stars Hugh Dancy, Mads Mikkelsen, Caroline Dhavernas, Gillian Anderson, and Laurence Fishburne, with Scott Thompson and Aaron Abrams receiving "also starring" status. The series is based on characters and elements appearing in Thomas Harris' novels Red Dragon (1981), Hannibal (1999), and Hannibal Rising (2006) and focuses on the relationship between FBI special investigator Will Graham and Dr. Hannibal Lecter, a forensic psychiatrist that is secretly a cannibalistic serial killer. The first half of the season serves as a loose adaptation of Hannibal while also adapting some elements from Hannibal Rising; the second half of the season adapts the plot of Red Dragon. The first seven episodes of season are named after different courses of Italian cuisine, the subsequent five are named for William Blake's series of The Great Red Dragon Paintings, and the finale's title is a phrase from Revelation 6:16.

The season premiered on June 4, 2015, on NBC. The season premiere received 2.57 million viewers with a 0.7/2 ratings share in the 18–49 demographics. The season ended on August 29, 2015, with an average of 1.31 million viewers, which was a 48% drop from the previous season. The season received acclaim from critics and audiences, praising the performances, writing, character development, cinematography and faithfulness to its source material. The series finale received universal acclaim in particular. Despite the acclaim, the season's low viewership prompted NBC to cancel the series in June 2015. Despite efforts in finding a new network for the series, as of June 2022, the series remains cancelled.

Cast and characters

Main
 Hugh Dancy as Will Graham
 Mads Mikkelsen as Dr. Hannibal Lecter
 Caroline Dhavernas as Alana Bloom
 Gillian Anderson as Bedelia Du Maurier
 Laurence Fishburne as Jack Crawford
 Scott Thompson as Jimmy Price
 Aaron Abrams as Brian Zeller

Recurring 
 Richard Armitage as Francis Dolarhyde
 Rutina Wesley as Reba McClane
 Joe Anderson as Mason Verger
 Nina Arianda as Molly Graham
 Fortunato Cerlino as Inspector Rinaldo Pazzi
 Raúl Esparza as Dr. Frederick Chilton
 Katharine Isabelle as Margot Verger
 Tao Okamoto as Chiyoh
 Glenn Fleshler as Dr. Cordell Doemling
 Kacey Rohl as Abigail Hobbs
 Lara Jean Chorostecki as Freddie Lounds
 Giorgio Lupano as Inspector Benetti
 Zachary Quinto as Neal Frank
 Rinaldo Rocco as Sogliato
 Vladimir Jon Cubrt as Garrett Jacob Hobbs
 Eddie Izzard as Abel Gideon
 Gina Torres as Phyllis "Bella" Crawford

Notable guests
 Tom Wisdom as Antony Dimmond
 Julian Richings as Caged Man
 Mía Maestro as Allegra Pazzi

Episodes

Production

Development
On May 9, 2014, NBC renewed the series for a third season. In July 2014, Robert Greenblatt, Chairman of NBC Entertainment, commented positively on the season's scripts although he said, "we still struggle to find an audience for it. It's great, we're keeping it going, we keep trying to build an audience for it. But, if this were on a cable network the small audience would not matter. It would be deemed more successful than it is on our network. [...] The minute you try and do something that is dark, and subversive, and frightening, and gets into that territory, you start to peel away the mass audience. It's just the way it is. Because the quality of that show is undeniable."

Writing
After the first season ended, Fuller stated that he planned for the show to run for seven seasons with the third season consisting of new material, while the fourth season would adapt Red Dragon. But after the second-season finale, Fuller changed plans, intending for the series to last six seasons while restructuring the material. He explained, "we are on track with the original plan with the one exception of condensing what was to have been Season 3 and Season 4 all into one season now. So, the first half of the season will have its finale that reaches a climax and wraps up that story in a great way, and then we start a new story, and then that will have its own climax at the end of the season. Two separate stories that’ll have two finales and so you get two seasons for the price of one." He later confirmed that Francis Dolarhyde would make his debut in the eighth episode, which will then allow them to adapt Red Dragon in the fourth season.

According to Fuller, the repercussions of the second-season finale would not be revealed on the premiere, which he said would focus on Hannibal Lecter and Bedelia Du Maurier. He said the fate of the characters would be revealed in "episode 2 or 3." He also explained, "the entire first half of the season is relatively FBI-light. It's all about the pursuit of Hannibal." In October 2014, Fuller confirmed that the second half of the season would adapt the plot of Red Dragon, remarking that deviations from the novel would happen as it was already adapted on Manhunter and Red Dragon, "if we do the same thing, we're a–holes."

Casting

At the 2014 San Diego Comic-Con, Fuller confirmed that Eddie Izzard would return as Abel Gideon for the season premiere in a flashback sequence as well as stating that Raúl Esparza would return as Frederick Chilton. He also confirmed that the season would introduce many characters from the novels Hannibal and Hannibal Rising, including Rinaldo Pazzi, Lady Murasaki and Dr. Cordell Doemling. In September 2014, Laurence Fishburne confirmed that despite his commitment to Black-ish, he would return as Jack Crawford in the third season. That same month, Gillian Anderson was announced to be upped to series regular.

In October 2014, Tao Okamoto was announced to play Lady Murasaki, "who possesses an alluring and classical beauty with a dark secret." However, Fuller clarified that Okamoto would play Chiyoh, Lady Murasaki's attendant. The season also introduced Will Graham's wife, Molly, in the eighth episode, with Nina Arianda joining the series in January 2015. Soon, Glenn Fleshler joined to play Dr. Cordell Doemling, "the personal doctor to a disfigured Mason Verger, quiet, very intelligent, and definitely creepy."

In March 2015, Zachary Quinto was announced to guest star as Neal Frank, "a patient of Bedelia Du Maurier."

In July 2014, Fuller confirmed that Francis Dolarhyde would make his debut in the eighth episode and serve as the main antagonist of the second half of the season. In January 2015, Richard Armitage was announced to play Dolarhyde, "a serial killer with a set of chompers that would make the Big Bad Wolf a little envious — and a penchant for targeting entire households for slaughter." A few days later, Rutina Wesley joined to play Reba McClane, "a blind woman who catches the eye of Francis Dolarhyde — AKA The Tooth Fairy — and represents his best chance at humanity."

In December 2014, it was announced that Michael Pitt chose not to return to play Mason Verger, being replaced by Joe Anderson. In February 2015, Gina Torres confirmed she would return as Bella Crawford.

Filming
The season started filming on October 20, 2014, in Toronto, and some filming of exterior and interior scenes were shot in Florence, Italy and Palermo.

Release

Broadcast
Like the previous seasons, the season was intended as a mid-season replacement, although the season was omitted from the NBC schedule by December 2014. In January 2015, NBC confirmed that the season would premiere in summer 2015. In March 2015, NBC officially announced that the season would premiere on June 4, 2015, airing Thursdays at 10:00pm, the same timeslot as the first season.

Following the series' cancellation, NBC announced that starting with the seventh episode, "Digestivo", the rest of the season would move to Saturdays at 10:00pm.

Marketing
On July 24, 2014, part of the cast and crew attended the 2014 San Diego Comic-Con to promote the season. The first teaser premiered in January 2015. In October 2014, the cast and crew attended the 2014 New York PaleyFest. In June 2015, Fuller attended the 2015 ATX Television Festival to promote the season and show a sneak peek of the second episode, "Primavera".

After the series' cancellation, the cast and crew attended the 2015 San Diego Comic-Con on July 11, 2015. The panel included a sneak peek of the second half of the season, as well as to give the audience an update on the series' possible continuation.

Home media release
The season was released on Blu-ray and DVD in region 1 on December 8, 2015.

On June 5, 2020, the season was available for streaming on Netflix. It exited the service on June 4, 2021.

Reception

Viewers

Critical reviews
The season received critical acclaim. On Rotten Tomatoes, season 3 has an approval rating of 98% with an average rating of 8.9/10 based on 47 reviews. The site's consensus reads: "Bryan Fuller serves up another delightfully demented season of Hannibal, featuring a hearty helping of gorgeous gore, paired with a sweet side of twisted humor." On Metacritic, the season has a score of 84 out of 100 based on 15 reviews, indicating "universal acclaim". 

Joshua Rivera of Business Insider stated that "Hannibal is a show that puts all of its chips on the table, blows up that table, and then builds something even more fascinating from what remains", and hailed it as one of the best shows on television. Dominic Patten of Deadline Hollywood also gave the first few episodes positive reviews also stating the show returns better than ever. The acting of Mads Mikkelsen and Gillian Anderson was particularly praised, with Bloody Disgusting writing, "Gillian Anderson's performance pushes Mads Mikkelsen in ways never thought possible," while also giving praise to creator and writer Bryan Fuller saying he creates "meticulously detailed scripts that define his characters in completely unpredictable ways." The review concludes by stating season 3 "re-establishes Hannibal as the best horror show on television." Chris Cabin of Slant Magazine gave it a very positive review, with four stars, and wrote that season 3 is "even more incisively and ambitiously written than the last season, and sporting the most radically expressive imagery currently on television." Jeff Jensen of Entertainment Weekly rated it an "A-" and wrote, "Hannibal remains the most engrossing (and gross) serial-killer drama on television, and the most beautiful."

Critics' top ten lists
The season appeared in many "Best of 2015" lists, becoming the 12th most mentioned series in the lists.

Awards and accolades

References

External links 
 
 

Hannibal (TV series)
2015 American television seasons